Anne Marie Letko (married name Lauck; born March 7, 1969, in Rochester, New York) is an American long-distance runner who competed in the Summer Olympics in 1996 (10th place in marathon) and 2000 (5000m).

Anne Marie Letko is the daughter of Jim and Sandy Letko. She started running at the age of 14 when she accompanied her father on jogs around the block. Letko claims that she became hooked on running after winner her age division in the Hampton Classic 7-miler. Lynne Lauck, her future mother-in-law, was the overall female winner in the same race. In high school, Letko finished 18th at the 1986 Kinney Cross Country Championships. She was two-time New Jersey State Champion in the indoor 3200 meter run and her mark of 10:39.6 was a state record from 1986 to 2001.

In 1991, Letko won the 10,000 metres at the World University Games in Sheffield, England, in what was a personal best for her at the time of 32:26.87. Her 31:37.26 at the 1993 World Championships in Stuttgart, Germany, was the fourth fastest 10,000 by an American woman. In 1994, Letko won USA 15K Championships at the newly named Gate River Run in Jacksonville, Florida.

Dehydration forced Letko to drop out of her debut marathon - the New York City Marathon - in 1993. She returned the following year, coached by for two-time NYC marathon champion Tom Fleming, to finish third with a time of 2:30:19. Letko qualified for the 1996 Summer Olympics in Atlanta, Georgia, with a third-place finish of 2:31:18 at the United States Olympic women's marathon trials the preceding February in Columbia, South Carolina. She was the top American woman in Atlanta finishing in 10th place with a time of 2:31:30.

Letko won Spokane, Washington's Lilac Bloomsday Run in 1993, Atlanta's historic Peachtree Road Race in 1994, and has competed in San Francisco's Bay to Breakers multiple times, finishing third in 1994, second in 1996, and third in 1998. She is the last American to win the Crim 10 mile race in Flint, Michigan (1994).

A native of Glen Gardner, New Jersey, Letko graduated from North Hunterdon High School in Clinton Township in 1987. In 1992, she earned a B.A. in English from Rutgers University. She competed under the name Anne Marie Lauck after she married Jim Lauck in 1995. Jim Lauck later became  a chiropractor. She was previously coached by Alberto Salazar.

Achievements

References

External links
 
 
 
 Anne Marie Lauck at USA Track & Field
 Anne Marie Letko at the International Association of Healthcare Practitioners

1969 births
American female long-distance runners
American female marathon runners
Athletes (track and field) at the 1996 Summer Olympics
Athletes (track and field) at the 2000 Summer Olympics
Living people
North Hunterdon High School alumni
Olympic track and field athletes of the United States
People from Glen Gardner, New Jersey
Sportspeople from Hunterdon County, New Jersey
Sportspeople from Rochester, New York
Track and field athletes from New Jersey
Universiade gold medalists for the United States
Universiade medalists in athletics (track and field)
World Athletics Championships athletes for the United States
Medalists at the 1991 Summer Universiade
21st-century American women